Saint James College may refer to:

 St. James College (Shelbyville) in the United States
 St. James College (Brisbane) in Australia
 St. James College (Victoria) in Australia
 St. James Catholic College on Tasmania in Australia